The Jade Mask is a 1945 film featuring Sidney Toler as Charlie Chan and the only appearance of Number Four Son, Eddie Chan, played by Edwin Luke, the real-life younger brother of Keye Luke, who had depicted Number One Son throughout the 1930s.

Synopsis 
Charlie Chan, along with #4 son Eddie and chauffeur, Birmingham Brown, looks into the apparent murder of an eccentric scientist in a spooky mansion.

Cast 
 Sidney Toler as Charlie Chan
Edwin Luke as Eddie Chan
 Mantan Moreland as Birmingham Brown
 Hardie Albright as Walter Meeker
 Frank Reicher as Harper
 Janet Warren as Jean Kent
 Cyril Delevanti as Roth
 Alan Bridge as Sheriff Mack
 Dorothy Granger as Stella Graham

External links
 
 

1945 films
American black-and-white films
Charlie Chan films
Monogram Pictures films
1945 mystery films
American mystery films
Films directed by Phil Rosen
1940s American films